

This is a list of the National Register of Historic Places listings in Pueblo County, Colorado, USA.

It is intended to be a complete list of the properties and districts on the National Register of Historic Places in Pueblo County, Colorado. The locations of National Register properties and districts for which the latitude and longitude coordinates are included below, may be seen in a map.

There are 67 properties and districts listed on the National Register in the county, one of which is also designated a National Historic Landmark. Another six properties was once listed but has been removed.

Current listings

{{NRHP row
|pos=30
|refnum=76000566
|type=HD
|article=Turkey Creek Canyon Rock Art District
|name=Indian Petroglyphs and Pictographs
|address=Address Restricted
|city=Penrose vicinity
|county=Pueblo County, Colorado 
|date=1976-05-03
|image=
|lat=
|lon=
|description=Known as "Indian Petroglyphs and Pictographs / Turkey Creek Canyon Rock Art District" by History Colorado,<ref>

|}

Former listings

|}

See also

 List of National Historic Landmarks in Colorado
 National Register of Historic Places listings in Colorado

References

 
Pueblo